Michael Kent Braun (born March 24, 1954) is an American businessman and politician serving as the junior United States senator from Indiana since 2019. A member of the Republican Party, he previously represented the 63rd district in the Indiana House of Representatives from 2014 to 2017. Braun was elected to the United States Senate in 2018, defeating Democratic incumbent Joe Donnelly.

Braun opposes the Affordable Care Act, same-sex marriage, abortion, and a pathway to citizenship for undocumented immigrants. He has called on the Republican Party to take climate change more seriously. He supported President Donald Trump's trade and tariff policies, although he was  previously an advocate of free trade. Braun voted to acquit Trump in the impeachment trial related to the Trump-Ukraine scandal. After Joe Biden won the 2020 presidential election and Trump refused to concede, making false claims of fraud, Braun defended Trump's efforts to overturn the election results.

Braun is running for governor of Indiana in 2024, having filed election papers on November 30, 2022, and declared his candidacy on December 12.

Early life, education and business career
Braun was born in Jasper, Indiana, on March 24, 1954. He graduated from Jasper High School. Braun was a three-sport star athlete; he married his high school sweetheart, Maureen, who was a cheerleader. He attended the all-male Wabash College, where he was a member of Phi Delta Theta fraternity and graduated summa cum laude with a bachelor's degree in economics, and Harvard Business School, where he earned an MBA.

After graduating from Harvard, Braun moved back to Indiana and joined his father's business manufacturing truck bodies for farmers. When the economy of the mid-1980s hit farmers hard and his father's business nearly went under, Braun steered the business in the more lucrative direction of selling truck accessories. The business subsequently grew from 15 employees to more than 300. In 1986 Braun and Daryl Rauscher acquired Meyer Body Inc., a manufacturer of truck bodies and distributor of truck parts and equipment. In 1995 Braun fully acquired the company. Meyer Body was renamed Meyer Distributing in 1999. Braun is its president and CEO. In 2018 Braun's personal finance disclosure listed assets worth between $35 million and $96 million.

Early political career 
Braun was formerly registered as a Democratic voter, but switched to the Republican Party in 2012. He claimed that he has always considered himself a conservative Republican, but voted in Democratic primaries for years because his home county, Dubois County, historically voted heavily Democratic downballot. According to Braun, until a massive Republican wave in 2016, even Republican-leaning voters voted in the Democratic primary to have a say in local elections. He was a member of the Jasper School Board from 2004 to 2014.

In 2014, Braun was elected to the Indiana House of Representatives, in the 63rd district. He resigned from the state House on November 1, 2017, to focus on his U.S. Senate campaign. During his last year in the state legislature, American Conservative Union gave him a lifetime score of 82%.

In July 2018, Braun called for the Indiana attorney general, Republican Curtis Hill, to resign amid allegations that Hill had drunkenly groped a lawmaker and three legislative staffers.

U.S. Senate

Elections

2018 

Braun won the Republican primary for the United States Senate in the 2018 election, defeating U.S. Representatives Todd Rokita and Luke Messer by over 56,000 votes. He received 208,520 votes, or roughly 41% of the total. Braun ran as an outsider, emphasizing his career in business. He defeated Democratic incumbent Joe Donnelly in the November general election with 51% of the vote to Donnelly's 45%; the Libertarian candidate, Lucy Brenton, tallied less than 4%. In late 2019, the Indianapolis Star reported that Braun's 2018 campaign was the beneficiary of $2.8 million in spending by a political action committee with strong connections to indicted money launderer Lev Parnas and one of his shell companies. Parnas supplied photographs of him and Braun embracing at a 2018 campaign event to the House of Representatives as part of his cooperation with the impeachment of President Trump. They were made public in January 2020.

Tenure
2010s
On January 3, 2019, Braun was sworn in as the junior United States senator from Indiana by Vice President Mike Pence.

In May 2019, Braun was one of eight senators who voted against a $19.1 billion emergency aid package for states and territories that endured hurricanes, floods and fires. Braun said the disaster assistance process was "just another path for runaway spending on unrelated projects." Despite his opposition, the package was enacted with bipartisan support and President Trump's approval.

Braun supported Trump's decision to withdraw American troops from northern Syria in October 2019. As a result, in that month, Turkey launched a military offensive against the American-allied Kurds in that area. After that, Braun called Trump "smart"; questioned why the U.S. should "be in the crossfire" between Turkey and the Kurds; and called the idea that ISIS would recover strength as a result of the conflict "an assumption".

In December 2019, Braun said that the impeachment inquiry against Donald Trump had been a "disaster for Democrats."

2020s
In May 2020, Senator Chuck Schumer put forth a resolution to officially release the guidance by the U.S. Centers for Disease Control and Prevention (CDC) on how to safely lift restrictions related to the COVID-19 pandemic in the United States. A leaked version of the guidance showed that it was more detailed and restrictive than the White House recommendations released in April 2020. Braun blocked Schumer's resolution, saying that the CDC's recommendations would hinder the economy.

On October 26, 2020, Braun voted to confirm Judge Amy Coney Barrett to the Supreme Court, and praised Barrett.

After Joe Biden defeated Trump in the November 2020 election, Braun refused to acknowledge Trump's defeat and promoted Trump's false claims of election fraud. Along with 10 other sitting and incoming Republican senators, Braun announced on January 2, 2021, that he would vote against counting the electoral votes from a number of states won by Biden four days later, seeking to subvert the election outcome. He was participating in the joint session of Congress counting the electoral votes when a mob of Trump supporters attacked the U.S. Capitol. In the wake of the attack, he tweeted, "Though I will continue to push for a thorough investigation into the election irregularities many Hoosiers are concerned with as my objection was intended, I have withdrawn that objection and will vote to get this ugly day behind us." He voted to count the electoral votes after Congress returned to session. The South Bend Tribune called Braun's flip-flop "a case of too little, too late." The Democratic Party of Indiana called for Braun's resignation, saying he "incited violence to overturn the presidential election and end American democracy."

In 2022, it was reported that rather than seeking reelection to the Senate, Braun will likely run for governor of Indiana in 2024, with incumbent Republican governor Eric Holcomb term-limited.

Committee assignments 
For the 117th United States Congress, Braun was named to five Senate committees:

 Committee on Agriculture, Nutrition, and Forestry

 Committee on Appropriations
 Subcommittee on Agriculture, Rural Development, Food and Drug Administration, and Related Agencies
 Subcommittee on Commerce, Justice, Science, and Related Agencies
 Subcommittee on Departments of Labor, Health and Human Services, and Education, and Related Agencies
 Subcommittee on Legislative Branch (Ranking)
 Subcommittee on Transportation, Housing and Urban Development, and Related Agencies 
 Committee on Health, Education, Labor, and Pensions
 Subcommittee on Employment and Workplace Safety (Ranking)
 Subcommittee on Primary Health and Retirement Security
 Committee on the Budget

 Special Committee on Aging

Caucus membership 
Senate Republican Conference

2024 Indiana gubernatorial campaign 
On November 30, 2022, Braun filed papers with the Secretary of State of Indiana to run for the state's governor in the 2024 Indiana gubernatorial election, following speculation since September that he would run for the office. His Senate seat will be an open contest in 2024.

According to the paperwork Braun's campaign filed, Braun appointed Kevin Broghamer as campaign treasurer, and his campaign will be headquartered in Carmel.

Political positions
The American Conservative Union gave Braun a 93% lifetime conservative rating in 2020.

Abortion 
Braun opposes abortion. He supported the 2022 overturning of Roe v. Wade, saying he was "excited" that states could write their own abortion laws.

Interracial marriage
Braun has said that the Supreme Court of the United States was wrong in its ruling that state interracial marriage bans were unconstitutional. Braun later stated that he was not paying attention to the question and that the Constitution prohibits discrimination of any kind based on race.

Donald Trump 
According to FiveThirtyEight, Braun voted with Donald Trump's position 90.9% of the time between Braun's inauguration and Trump's departure from office two years later.

During Trump's first impeachment and impeachment trial, regarding the Trump–Ukraine scandal, Braun became one of Trump's most prominent defenders, defending him in many media appearances. He voted to acquit Trump, and when asked whether it is acceptable for Trump to withhold U.S. foreign aid to coerce a foreign leader to investigate Joe Biden, he said that he did not believe that such behavior was proper but that "it didn't happen." Braun also said that Trump did what he did out of a desire to reduce corruption in Ukraine. After Trump was acquitted, Braun said that Trump "hopefully" learned something from the trial.

Effort to overturn 2020 presidential election result

After Biden won the 2020 presidential election, Trump refused to concede and made baseless claims of election fraud. Braun defended, and joined in, Trump's attempt to overturn the election results. He wrote a Washington Examiner editorial criticizing the media for not taking accusations of voter fraud seriously. Along with 10 other Republican senators, Braun initially pledged to object to the counting of the electoral votes in several key states. After the storming of the Capitol by a violent pro-Trump mob, Braun reversed himself and voted against objections to the election results, saying that he "didn't feel comfortable with today's events."

In Trump's second impeachment trial, on charges of incitement of insurrection, Braun voted to acquit Trump.

On May 28, 2021, Braun abstained from voting on the creation of an independent commission to investigate the January 6 storming of the Capitol.

Economy 

Braun supported the Republican Party's tax legislation in 2017. He said the tax reform bill was "revenue-neutral"; the nonpartisan Congressional Budget Office estimated that the bill would increase U.S. debt. Braun has called for cuts to the U.S. budget, saying that the U.S. "has a spending problem."

Environmentalism 

Braun is a self-described conservationist. He has called Swedish climate activist Greta Thunberg an "inspiration" and advocated that the Republican Party be more aggressive in combating climate change. He opposed the 2015 Paris climate change agreement, but supports using reforestation, carbon pricing, and carbon capture to reduce or mitigate carbon dioxide emissions. He also serves as the chair of the bipartisan Climate Solutions Caucus, which was founded in October 2019. Braun sponsored the Growing Climate Solutions Act, a bill that would make it simpler for farmers to sell carbon credits on existing carbon trading markets in California and in the Northeast.

Braun has a 4% lifetime score from the environmental advocacy group League of Conservation Voters.

Trade 

In 2018, Braun supported Trump's trade and tariff policies, saying that they have "yielded phenomenal results." Previously, he supported free trade policies.

Braun voted in support of the United States–Mexico–Canada Agreement.

Health care 

Braun opposes the Affordable Care Act, supports efforts to repeal it, and supports a lawsuit to strike down the entirety of the ACA. Braun has called for "free-market competition" and "market-driven" solutions on health care. During his 2018 Senate campaign, he criticized incumbent Democratic Senator Joe Donnelly as a "defender of Obamacare." Braun expressed support for keeping in place protections for individuals with preexisting conditions (a popular provision of the ACA), although both House repeal efforts supported by Braun and the lawsuit supported by Braun would effectively end protections for individuals with preexisting conditions.

Immigration 

Braun has said, "building the wall must be the first step to any solution" on illegal immigration. He opposes a pathway to citizenship for undocumented immigrants who came to the United States as minors, known as DREAMers.

LGBT rights 

Asked for his view on the legalization of same-sex marriage, Braun said, "I believe in traditional marriage." He fought to keep marriage defined as "between a man and a woman" in the Indiana Republican Party platform. In the Indiana state legislature, he supported the Indiana Religious Freedom Restoration Act and opposed amendments to the bill that would have banned discrimination based on sexual orientation and gender identity.

Police reform 
In June 2020, after the murder of George Floyd, Braun introduced legislation to reform qualified immunity, a legal doctrine that shields police officers from lawsuits over constitutional violations if the violated constitutional right has not been clearly established in a previous court decision. His legislation would have made it easier to sue police officers for rights violations. But after an interview with Tucker Carlson and backlash from police unions the next month, Braun dropped his bill. In May 2021, he wrote, "I oppose any reform to the current doctrine of qualified immunity" and opposed federal efforts to reform local police departments.

COVID-19 pandemic 
In September 2021, Braun opposed the planned COVID-19 vaccine mandate for companies with more than 100 employees, calling it as the "biggest overreach by federal government I’ve seen." In October 2021, he invited Chicago police officers who were suspended for refusing to get vaccinated against COVID-19 to work in Indiana, saying, "plenty of departments are hiring now."

Electoral history

Personal life
Braun and his wife, Maureen, have four children. He is Roman Catholic. Braun's brother, Steve Braun, was also a politician in Indiana.

References

External links

 Official U.S. Senate website
 campaign site

 
 

|-

|-

|-

|-

|-

1954 births
20th-century American businesspeople
21st-century American politicians
American chief executives of manufacturing companies
American Roman Catholics
Braun family of Indiana
Businesspeople from Indiana
Catholics from Indiana
Harvard Business School alumni
Indiana Democrats
Indiana Republicans
Living people
Members of the Indiana House of Representatives
People from Jasper, Indiana
Republican Party United States senators from Indiana
School board members in Indiana
Wabash College alumni
Candidates in the 2024 United States elections